The 2007 Le Mans Series was the fourth season of ACO's Le Mans Series. It was a series for Le Mans prototype and Grand Touring style cars broken into four classes: LMP1, LMP2, GT1, and GT2. It began on 15 April and ended on 10 November after six races.

Schedule

Season results
Overall winners in bold.

Teams Championships
Points were awarded to the top 8 finishers in the order of 10-8-6-5-4-3-2-1. Teams with multiple entries did not have their cars combined and each entry number was scored separately in the championship. Cars which failed to complete 70% of the winner's distance were not awarded points.

The top two finishers in each teams championship earned automatic entry to the 2008 24 Hours of Le Mans.

LMP1 Standings

† - Half-points were awarded at this race due to less than five cars competing in this class.

LMP2 Standings

† - Half-points were awarded at this race due to less than five cars competing in this class.

GT1 Standings

† - Half-points were awarded at this race due to less than five cars competing in this class.

GT2 Standings

Drivers Championships
Points were awarded to the top 8 finishers in the order of 10-8-6-5-4-3-2-1.  Drivers who did not drive for at least 45 minutes did not receive points.

LMP1 Standings

† - Half-points were awarded at this race due to less than five cars competing in this class.

LMP2 Standings

† - Half-points were awarded at this race due to less than five cars competing in this class.

GT1 Standings

† - Half-points were awarded at this race due to less than five cars competing in this class.

GT2 Standings

External links
 Le Mans Series homepage - English
 Mariantic Le Mans Series 2007 News
 Endurance-Info Daily News (French)

 
European Le Mans Series seasons
European Le Mans Series
European Le Mans Series